Stéphane Sadock Ndobé (born 9 September 1998) is a Central African footballer who plays as a centre-back for Tempête Mocaf and the Central African Republic national team.

Club career
Ndobé debuted with the Central African Republic national team in a 2–1 friendly win over the Gambia on 27 March 2017.

References

External links
 
 

1998 births
Living people
Central African Republic footballers
Central African Republic international footballers
Association football defenders